Daniel Jones (born 22 July 1973) is an English-born Australian musician, songwriter, record producer and real estate agent. He was a member of the Australian pop duo Savage Garden, whose international hit singles included "I Want You", "To the Moon and Back", "Truly Madly Deeply", "I Knew I Loved You", and "Crash and Burn".

Personal life
Jones was born in Southend-on-Sea, Essex, England, the youngest of 3 boys. When he was a year old, his family moved to Brisbane, Queensland, Australia. 

In 2000, Jones met Kathleen de Leon (born 1 September 1977), an original member of Hi-5, an Australian children's musical group aligned with a TV series of the same name, at the 42nd Annual TV Week Logie Awards. Jones proposed to de Leon on his 30th birthday at the GPO Bar in Brisbane. Jones wed de Leon at Avica Weddings and Resort on the Gold Coast in Queensland on 9 October 2005.

Musical career

Early career
Jones was about 18 years old when he was in a band called Red Edge with his brother and some friends, but the band needed a singer. Jones put an advertisement in the local Brisbane music paper, Time Off, looking for a suitable singer. Darren Hayes responded to the ad and became their singer. Hayes got tired of performing other people's songs and he was ready to quit Red Edge, and Jones wanted to create his own music. Both decided to leave the band and began to pursue a career together, marking the beginning of Savage Garden.

Savage Garden

According to the credits on their albums, Darren Hayes handled lead vocals and arrangements, while Jones played guitar, keyboard and sang. They wrote their songs together.

Originally, both men traveled the world to promote their first album, Savage Garden (1997). As travel strain and other issues began to take their toll on Jones, he decided that he was not comfortable with the press junket circuits and the intense scrutiny from fans and media that came with them, and informed the band's manager that he wanted to leave. As a result, Hayes agreed to take on the lion's share of the promotional duties for the band until the release of their second album. Affirmation (1999). In 2001, Hayes announced that Savage Garden was over. Affirmation sold 8 million copies.

After Savage Garden
In 2001, Jones built his own recording studio and launched the music label Meridien Musik. The label's first act was  Aneiki, a duo consisting of Grant Wallis and Jennifer Waite, who was one of the backing vocalists who travelled with Savage Garden during their The Future of Earthly Delites tour. Meridien Musik released their album Words in Place of Objects; Jones five songs with Waite: "Dearest", "She Says", "Saving Grace", "Feel This Fool" and "Sugarlust". That was the only music Aneiki would release.

In 2002, Jones worked with another Australian duo, called Bachelor Girl, to co-write a song called "Falling" for their fourth and last album, Dysfunctional. In 2004, Jones helped produce for Australian pop-rock musician Julie Strickland and the Australian act The Wish (Peter Freebairn and Bill Kio) for their respective debut albums.

Jones then left the music industry, moved to Las Vegas, and went into the real estate business. As of 2015, Jones, de Leon, and their two daughters, Mikayla (born 2006) and Keira (born 2010) reside in the United States.

References

1973 births
Living people
APRA Award winners
Australian pop musicians
Australian record producers
Australian songwriters
Australian rock guitarists
Australian keyboardists
Australian multi-instrumentalists
English emigrants to Australia
Australian people of English descent
Musicians from Brisbane
People from Southend-on-Sea
Musicians from Essex
Savage Garden members
Australian expatriates in the United States